Kuncho Kunchev (born 1 December 1951) is a Bulgarian boxer. He competed in the men's featherweight event at the 1972 Summer Olympics.

References

1951 births
Living people
Bulgarian male boxers
Olympic boxers of Bulgaria
Boxers at the 1972 Summer Olympics
Sportspeople from Plovdiv
Featherweight boxers
20th-century Bulgarian people